Fernando Manuel Romay Pereiro (born 23 September 1959) is a Spanish retired professional basketball player, who represented his native country in two consecutive Summer Olympic Games, starting in 1980. At his second Olympic appearance, in 1984, he won the silver medal with the Spain's national basketball team. He is considered to be one of the best players in Real Madrid history, and also one of the best players in Spanish basketball history. He stands around 7 ft tall.

Professional basketball club career
During his club career, Romay won numerous international titles. As a member of Real Madrid, he won four FIBA Intercontinental Cup championships (1976, 1977, 1978, 1981), three FIBA European Super Cup championships (1984, 1988, 1989), two EuroLeague championships (1978, 1980), three FIBA Saporta Cup championships (1984, 1989, 1992), and the FIBA Korać Cup championship in 1988. With Real Madrid, he also won eight Spanish League championships in total.

He won four Spanish LEB Primera División championships (1977, 1979, 1980, 1982), and four Spanish ACB League championships (1984, 1985, 1986, 1993). He also won five Spanish Cup titles (1977, 1985, 1986, 1989, 1993), and the Spanish Supercup in 1984.

Romay was the Spanish ACB League's all-time leader in blocked shots with 671, until Fran Vázquez surpassed his record on 17 April 2016.

National team basketball career
Romay was a member of the senior Spanish national basketball team. With Spain, he played at the 1980 Summer Olympics, and at the 1984 Summer Olympics, where he won a silver medal.

He also represented Spain at the following major FIBA tournaments: the 1981 EuroBasket, the 1982 FIBA World Cup, the 1983 EuroBasket, where he won a silver medal, at the 1985 EuroBasket, the 1986 FIBA World Cup, the 1987 EuroBasket, and the 1990 FIBA World Cup.

American football playing career
After his retirement from playing professional basketball, in October 1995, Romay became an American football player with Madrid Panteras, and on 8 June 1996, he won the Spanish league Bowl. He did not play any minutes in the finals game against the Vilafranca Eagles.

Television career
Romay makes regular appearances on Spanish television on programmes, such as Mira Quien Baila!, which is the Spanish version of Dancing with the Stars.

References

External links
 Fernando Romay at FIBA.com
 Fernando Romay at Basketball-Reference.com
 Fernando Romay at SeleccionBaloncesto.es 
 Fernando Romay at realmadrid.com
 Fernando Romay at ACB.com 
 Fernando Romay at COE.es 

1959 births
Living people
Basketball players at the 1980 Summer Olympics
Basketball players at the 1984 Summer Olympics
CB Zaragoza players
Centers (basketball)
Liga ACB players
Medalists at the 1984 Summer Olympics
Olympic basketball players of Spain
Olympic medalists in basketball
Olympic silver medalists for Spain
Real Madrid Baloncesto players
Spanish men's basketball players
1982 FIBA World Championship players
1990 FIBA World Championship players
1986 FIBA World Championship players